US Post Office-Boone is a historic post office building located at Boone, Watauga County, North Carolina.  It was designed by the Office of the Supervising Architect under Louis A. Simon and built in 1938. It is a steel framed stone building on a raised stone foundation in the Colonial Revival style.  It consists of a five bay by two bay main block with a three bay service block. The building features Doric order pilasters at the entry and an octagonal lantern on the roof ridge with paired Tuscan order columns.

It was listed on the National Register of Historic Places in 1996.

References

Boone
Colonial Revival architecture in North Carolina
Government buildings completed in 1938
Buildings and structures in Watauga County, North Carolina
National Register of Historic Places in Watauga County, North Carolina